The Common Technical Document (CTD) is a set of specifications for an application dossier for the registration of Medicines and designed to be used across Europe, Japan and the United States and beyond.

Synopsis
The CTD is an internationally agreed format for the preparation of applications regarding new drugs intended to be submitted to regional regulatory authorities in participating countries. It was developed by the European Medicines Agency (EMA, Europe), the Food and Drug Administration (FDA, US) and the Ministry of Health, Labour and Welfare (Japan) starting at the World Health Organization International Conference of Drug Regulatory Authorities (ICDRA) at Paris in 1989.

The CTD is maintained by the International Council on Harmonisation of Technical Requirements for Registration of Pharmaceuticals for Human Use (ICH).

After the United States, European Union and Japan, the CTD was adopted by several other countries including Canada and Switzerland.

The Paper CTD is destined to be replaced by its electronic counterpart, the eCTD.

Document contents
The Common Technical Document is divided into five modules:
 Administrative and prescribing information
 Overview and summary of modules 3 to 5
 Quality (pharmaceutical documentation)
 Preclinical (Pharmacology/Toxicology)
 Clinical – efficacy and safety (Clinical Trials)

Detailed subheadings for each Module are specified for all jurisdictions.  The contents of Module 1 and certain subheadings of other Modules will differ, based on national requirements.

See also
 Clinical Data Interchange Standards Consortium
 Clinical trial
 eCTD
 Harmonization in clinical trials

References

External links
 ICH
 Common Technical Document

Clinical research
Clinical data management
Pharmaceuticals policy
Drug safety
Life sciences industry
International standards